The discography of Yugoslav rock band Bijelo Dugme consists of 9 studio albums, 4 live albums, 12 compilation albums, 12 Singles, 4 video albums, 3 box sets and 1 joint project album. The list does not include solo material or side projects performed by the members.

Studio albums

Live albums

Compilation albums

Singles

Video albums

Box sets

Joint projects

References 
 EX YU ROCK enciklopedija 1960-2006, Janjatović Petar; 
 Bijelo Dugme at Discogs

Discographies of Bosnia and Herzegovina artists
Rock music group discographies